Danilo Quaranta (born 23 March 1997) is an Italian professional footballer who plays for Ascoli.

Club career
He made his Serie C debut for Olbia on 4 September 2016 in a game against Lucchese.

On 2 September 2019, he joined Catanzaro on loan.

References

External links
 

1997 births
People from Teramo
Living people
Italian footballers
Association football defenders
Ascoli Calcio 1898 F.C. players
Olbia Calcio 1905 players
U.S. Pistoiese 1921 players
U.S. Catanzaro 1929 players
Serie B players
Serie C players
Sportspeople from the Province of Teramo
Footballers from Abruzzo